Sadasiva Brahmendra Swami Temple is a Hindu temple and situated in Karur, Tamil Nadu, India, near Nerur. It is near to the Kaveri river. This temple is on the way of Karur to Tirumukkudalur Road after Nerur. The God of Sadasiva Brahmendra's graven is behind this temple. It is also known as Agneeshwarar.

It is called as Sri Sadasiva Brahmendral Adhishtanam.

Hindu temples in Karur district